Andrew Junipero Fox (born January 12, 1971) is an American professional baseball coach and a former infielder. He played in Major League Baseball  (MLB) from 1996 to 2004 for five different teams. He currently serves on the coaching staff of the Boston Red Sox as their major league field coordinator.

Playing career
Fox, a second round draft pick, graduated from Christian Brothers High School in Sacramento. He attended St. Mary, a Catholic school, in Sacramento for grades k-8.

In Major League Baseball, he played for the New York Yankees, Arizona Diamondbacks, Florida Marlins, Texas Rangers, and Montreal Expos. He won a World Series as a member of the Marlins' 2003 World Series championship team and as a member of the Yankees' 1996 World Series championship team. While with the Diamondbacks, he set the team's single season record for times hit by pitch.

Coaching/managing career

After his playing career ended, Fox became a minor league coach in the Texas Rangers' farm system in 2005 and served as manager of the Class A Clinton LumberKings in 2006. On March 24, 2007, Fox replaced Perry Hill as the Florida Marlins' first base and infield coach. Fox had previously played under Hill in 2002; similarly, former Marlins manager Fredi Gonzalez was a coach for the Marlins during part of Fox's playing career with the team. After the 2009 season, Fox was named the hitting coach of the Double-A West Tenn Diamond Jaxx of the Southern League.

Fox was named minor-league infield coordinator by the Boston Red Sox for the 2011 season. He still held that position as of the 2019 season, while adding the new responsibilities of assistant field coordinator for Boston's player development organization.

In December 2021, Fox was named to Boston's major-league coaching staff, in the role of field coordinator.

References

External links

 

1971 births
Living people
Albany-Colonie Yankees players
American expatriate baseball players in Canada
Arizona Diamondbacks players
Baseball coaches from California
Baseball players from Sacramento, California
Calgary Cannons players
Columbus Clippers players
Greensboro Hornets players
Gulf Coast Yankees players
El Paso Diablos players
Florida Marlins coaches
Florida Marlins players
Major League Baseball first base coaches
Major League Baseball infielders
Major League Baseball outfielders
Minor league baseball coaches
Minor league baseball managers
Montreal Expos players
New York Yankees players
Norwich Navigators players
Oklahoma RedHawks players
Prince William Cannons players
Salt Lake Stingers players
Texas Rangers players
Tucson Sidewinders players